The 1976 CCHA Men's Ice Hockey Tournament was the fifth CCHA Men's Ice Hockey Tournament. It was played between March 18 and March 21, 1976. All games were played at St. Louis Arena in St. Louis, Missouri, the home venue of the St. Louis Billikens.

Format
The tournament featured two rounds of play. Only the top four teams in the conference standings were eligible for postseason play. In the semifinal the first and fourth seeds and the second and third seeds were matched as opponents in single game series with the winners advancing to the Championship. In the finals the teams played a 2 game series where the squad that score the most combined goals would be crowned champion.

Conference standings
Note: GP = Games played; W = Wins; L = Losses; T = Ties; PTS = Points; GF = Goals For; GA = Goals Against

Bracket

Note: * denotes overtime period(s)

Semifinals

(1) Bowling Green vs. (4) Western Michigan

(2) Saint Louis vs. (3) Lake Superior State

Championship

(2) Saint Louis vs. (4) Western Michigan

Tournament awards

MVP
None

References

External links
CCHA Champions
1975–76 CCHA Standings
1975–76 NCAA Standings

CCHA Men's Ice Hockey Tournament
Ccha tournament
CCHA Men's Ice Hockey